De'Mornay Pierson-El (born December 26, 1995) is an American football wide receiver for the New Jersey Generals of the United States Football League (USFL). He played college football at Nebraska.

High school career
During his four years as an athlete for the West Potomac varsity football team, Pierson-El helped the Wolverines capture a share of the 2011 Patriot District championship as a sophomore receiver, led the team to a playoff berth as a junior running back in 2012, and kept West Potomac competitive as a senior quarterback in 2013. He also played defensive back and returned kicks along the way. As a senior, he earned first-team VHSL all-state honors as an all-purpose defensive player.

College career
Pierson-El was a versatile and electrifying performer for Nebraska throughout his Cornhusker career. A Virginia native, Pierson-El burst onto the scene in 2014 earning All-America honors as a punt returner as a true freshman. He continued to be a difference-maker on special teams throughout his career, while also producing an outstanding Nebraska career as a receiver.

Statistics

Professional career

Washington Redskins
Pierson-El was signed by the Washington Redskins as an undrafted free agent on May 2, 2018, but was waived later that month.

Montreal Alouettes
He then signed with the Montreal Alouettes but was cut in August after only dressing for one game.

Salt Lake Stallions
Pierson-El later joined the Salt Lake Stallions of the Alliance of American Football for the 2019 season.

Oakland Raiders
After the AAF suspended football operations, Pierson-El signed with the Oakland Raiders on April 8, 2019. He was waived on August 31, 2019. He was re-signed to the practice squad on December 4, 2019. His practice squad contract with the team expired on January 6, 2020.

St. Louis BattleHawks
Pierson-El was drafted by the St. Louis BattleHawks in the 2020 XFL Draft on October 16, 2019. He signed a contract with the team on January 7, 2020. He had his contract terminated when the league suspended operations on April 10, 2020.

Las Vegas Raiders (second stint)
Pierson-El re-signed with the Las Vegas Raiders on April 30, 2020. He was waived on September 5, 2020. He was re-signed to the practice squad on September 30, 2020. He was released on October 21.

Denver Broncos
On June 17, 2021, Pierson-El signed with the Denver Broncos. He was waived on August 31, 2021. On September 6, 2021, Pierson-El was re-signed to the practice squad. He was released on December 21.

New Jersey Generals
Pierson-El signed with the New Jersey Generals of the USFL on December 16, 2022.

References

1995 births
Living people
Players of American football from Virginia
American football wide receivers
Sportspeople from Alexandria, Virginia
Nebraska Cornhuskers football players
Washington Redskins players
Montreal Alouettes players
Canadian football wide receivers
Salt Lake Stallions players
Oakland Raiders players
St. Louis BattleHawks players
American players of Canadian football
Las Vegas Raiders players
Denver Broncos players
New Jersey Generals (2022) players